Patti Kim (born 1970) is a Korean American writer, a Diane Cleaver fellow and the author of the award-winning novel A Cab Called Reliable (St. Martin's Press), children's picture book Here I Am (Capstone), middle grade novel, I'm Ok (Simon & Schuster), and middle grade novel, It's Girls Like You, Mickey (Atheneum).

Biography
Patti Kim was born in Busan, South Korea, and immigrated to the United States with her family in 1974 when she was four years old. She graduated from the University of Maryland

Selected works
 A Cab Called Reliable, St. Martin's Griffin, 1998
Here I Am, Capstone 2013
I'm Ok, Atheneum Books at Simon & Schuster 2018
It's Girls Like You, Mickey, Atheneum Books at Simon & Schuster 2020

Awards and recognition
 I'm OK designated as An Asian/Pacific American Literature Award Honor Book
EmpathyLab Editors' Pick for inclusion in its "2018 Read for Empathy Guide". (February 2018) (2014)
GOLD Winner for Picture Books, Family Choice Awards (2014)
National Parenting Publications Award (NAPPA) (2014)
Tillywig Brainchild Award (2014)
Best Children’s Book of the Year by Children’s Book Committee at Bank Street College of Education (2014)
Will Eisner Comic Industry Award Nominee (2014)
Kirkus Reviews Best Children’s Books (2013)
Kirkus Reviews Best Picture Books About Family & Friends (2013)
IndieFab Book of the Year Award (2013)
Diane Cleaver Fellow at Ledig House
Book-of-the-Month Club's Stephen Crane Award for First Fiction
Honorable Mention by Huffington Post Books
Towson University Prize for Fiction 1997

References

Living people
20th-century American novelists
American women novelists
American writers of Korean descent
1970 births
University of Maryland, College Park alumni
South Korean emigrants to the United States
People from Busan
20th-century American women writers
21st-century American women